Gourbeyrella madininae is a species of beetle in the family Cerambycidae. It was described by Chalumeau and Touroult in 2004.

References

Tillomorphini
Beetles described in 2004